Possum Walk Creek may refer to:

Possum Walk Creek (Lick Creek), a stream in Arkansas and Missouri
Possum Walk Creek (Mayes Branch), a stream in Missouri